Elaine Bossik is an American novelist and screenwriter.  Her romance novel The Last Victim was featured in the online book review magazine Small Press Bookwatch, which is published by the Midwest Book Review.  She is a member of the Boca Raton, Florida, branch of the National League of American PEN Women.

Biography

Personal life
Elaine Bossik obtained BA and MS degrees in education from Brooklyn College. Before writing a novel, she worked as a New York public school teacher and as a copywriter and medical editor. Elaine lives with her husband in Boynton Beach, Florida.

Writing career
Her first novel, The Last Victim, was published on July 15, 2011 by Portable Shopper, LLC. Prior to that time, she wrote instructional articles under her pen name, Elaine Radford, for the online screenwriting magazine Scriptologist.com.

Bibliography

Single novels
The Last Victim, 2011/July

References and sources

External links
 Elaine Bossik

American romantic fiction writers
Year of birth missing (living people)
Brooklyn College alumni
Living people
Place of birth missing (living people)